The 1955 Rhineland-Palatinate state election was conducted on 15 May 1955 to elect members to the Landtag, the state legislature of Rhineland-Palatinate, West Germany.

|-
|colspan=15| 
|-
! style="background-color:#E9E9E9;text-align:left;" width=300px colspan=2|Party
! style="background-color:#E9E9E9;text-align:right;" width=50px |Vote %
! style="background-color:#E9E9E9;text-align:right;" width=50px |Vote % ±
! style="background-color:#E9E9E9;text-align:right;" width=50px |Seats
! style="background-color:#E9E9E9;text-align:right;" width=50px |Seats ±
|-
| width=5px style="background-color: " |
| style="text-align:left;" | Christian Democratic Union
| style="text-align:right;" | 46.8
| style="text-align:right;" | +7.6
| style="text-align:right;" | 51
| style="text-align:right;" | +8
|-
| style="background-color: " |
| style="text-align:left;" | Social Democratic Party
| style="text-align:right;" | 31.7
| style="text-align:right;" | –2.3
| style="text-align:right;" | 36
| style="text-align:right;" | –2
|-
| style="background-color: " |
| style="text-align:left;" | Free Democratic Party
| style="text-align:right;" | 12.7
| style="text-align:right;" | –4.2
| style="text-align:right;" | 13
| style="text-align:right;" | –6
|-
| style="background-color: " |
| style="text-align:left;" | Communist Party of Germany
| style="text-align:right;" | 3.2
| style="text-align:right;" | –1.1
| style="text-align:right;" | 0
| style="text-align:right;" | ±0
|-
| style="background-color: " |
| style="text-align:left;" | Others
| style="text-align:right;" | 5.6
| style="text-align:right;" | +0.3
| style="text-align:right;" | 0
| style="text-align:right;" | ±0
|- style="background: #E9E9E9"
! style="text-align:left;" colspan=2| Total
| 100.0
| —
| 100
| ±0
|-
| colspan=9 style="text-align:left;" | Source: parties-and-elections.de
|}

1955
1955 elections in Germany
1955 in West Germany